Okoduwa is a surname. Notable people with the surname include:

Emmanuel Okoduwa (born 1983), Nigerian footballer
Thelma Okoduwa, Nigerian actress

Surnames of Nigerian origin